Roger Claver Djapone Assalé (born 13 November 1993) is an Ivorian professional footballer who plays as a forward for Ligue 2 club Dijon.

Club career
Assalé was part of the Young Boys squad that won the 2017–18 Swiss Super League, their first league title in 32 years. On 31 January 2020, he joined La Liga side CD Leganés on loan until the end of the season.

On 5 September 2020, he became a new Dijon player.

In August 2021 Assalé joined 2. Bundesliga club Werder Bremen on loan for the 2021–22 season. Werder Bremen secured an option to sign him permanently at the end of the loan. He left the club at the end of the season having made six appearances while Werder Bremen achieved promotion to the Bundesliga.

International career
Assalé made his full international debut for the Ivory Coast national team in a friendly match against Cameroon on 10 November 2014. He scored his first international goal against Moldova in March 2018.

Career statistics

Club

International

Scores and results list Ivory Coast's goal tally first, score column indicates score after each Assalé goal.

Honours
Séwé Sport
Ligue 1: 2012–13, 2013–14
CAF Confederation Cup: Runners-up 2014

TP Mazembe
Linafoot: 2015–16
CAF Champions League: 2015
CAF Super Cup: 2016
CAF Confederation Cup: 2016

Young Boys
Swiss Super League: 2017–18, 2018–19

Werder Bremen
2. Bundesliga runner-up: 2021–22

Ivory Coast
Africa Cup of Nations: 2015

References

External links

1993 births
Living people
People from Abengourou
Ivorian footballers
Ivory Coast youth international footballers
Association football forwards
Ivory Coast international footballers
Africa Cup of Nations-winning players
2015 Africa Cup of Nations players
2019 Africa Cup of Nations players
Séwé Sport de San-Pédro players
TP Mazembe players
BSC Young Boys players
CD Leganés players
Dijon FCO players
SV Werder Bremen players
Linafoot players
Swiss Super League players
La Liga players
Ligue 1 players
2. Bundesliga players
Ivorian expatriate footballers
Ivorian expatriate sportspeople in the Democratic Republic of the Congo
Expatriate footballers in the Democratic Republic of the Congo
Ivorian expatriate sportspeople in Switzerland
Expatriate footballers in Switzerland
Ivorian expatriate sportspeople in Spain
Expatriate footballers in Spain
Ivorian expatriate sportspeople in France
Expatriate footballers in France
Ivorian expatriate sportspeople in Germany
Expatriate footballers in Germany